Costigan Lake is a lake in northern Saskatchewan, Canada. It is the source of the Geikie River which flows to Wollaston Lake, which drains via two river systems: through the Churchill River system to Hudson Bay; and the Mackenzie River system to the Arctic Ocean.

See also
List of lakes of Saskatchewan

References

Lakes of Saskatchewan